The Big Little Person was a 1919 American silent romantic drama film produced and distributed by Universal Pictures. Based on the novel of the same name by Rebecca Lane Hooper Eastman, the film was directed by Robert Z. Leonard and starred his then-wife and muse Mae Murray. Rudolph Valentino, who was credited as M. Rodolpho De Valentina, had a supporting role. The film is now considered lost.

Cast
 Mae Murray - Arathea Manning
 Clarissa Selwynne - Mrs. Manning
 M. Rodolpho De Valentina - Arthur Endicott
 Allan Sears - Gerald Staples
 Mrs. Bertram Grassby - Marion Beemis

References

External links
 
 Surviving lantern slide to the film

1919 films
1919 romantic drama films
American silent feature films
American romantic drama films
American black-and-white films
Films based on American novels
Films directed by Robert Z. Leonard
Lost American films
Universal Pictures films
1919 lost films
Lost romantic drama films
1910s American films
Silent romantic drama films
Silent American drama films
1910s English-language films